Lloyd Norris-Jones is a South African field hockey player.  At the 2012 Summer Olympics, he competed for the national team in the men's tournament.

He plays for the Delhi Waveriders in the Hockey India League. He currently plays for the UHC Hamburg.

References

External links

Living people
South African people of British descent
South African male field hockey players
Field hockey players at the 2012 Summer Olympics
Olympic field hockey players of South Africa
Field hockey players at the 2014 Commonwealth Games
Commonwealth Games competitors for South Africa
1986 births
Sportspeople from Cape Town
2006 Men's Hockey World Cup players
2010 Men's Hockey World Cup players
2014 Men's Hockey World Cup players
Hockey India League players
Delhi Waveriders players
21st-century South African people